The Viaduc d'Ormaiztegi or Ormaiztegi Viaduct is a lattice girder viaduct in Ormaiztegi, Spain that was formerly used by a railroad to link a line from Madrid to Irun. It is now considered a historical monument.

History 

The viaduct was designed by French engineer Alexandre Lavalley, and construction was completed in 1863.

The viaduct was destroyed during the Spanish Civil War and was reconstructed in 1940.

In 1996, it ceased to be used and was considered obsolete. A modern viaduct was built nearby. To prevent its demolition, it was declared a historical monument, since after more than 130 years, it has been considered a symbol of Ormaiztegi.

Structure 

References 

Viaducts in Spain
Bridges completed in 1863
Landmarks in Spain
Lattice truss bridges